Haide Klüglein (born 1939) is a female German swimmer, who is starting for the Flensburger Schwimmklub (Flensburg swimming club).

The multiple holder of swimming-records in Schleswig-Holstein (as of 2014), German Champion (in 2011 and in 2013 over 2,5 kilometres Open water swimming) and German Vicechampion (in 2005 over 400 and 800 metres freestyle swimming) as well as eight times World Championship-competitor (as of 2014) reached her biggest successes on long distances in Open water swimming of the Masters, which Klüglein usually completes with two short distances. Before every competition in Open water swimming the exceptional sportswoman is in the habit of checking the official given water temperature by her own thermometer – the German Swimming Federation dictates in general at German Championships at least 16 °C.

For her success awarded the council of Flensburg Haide Klüglein in 2009 with the medal of honour in Bronze.

Best results (selection)

Best results

Records

Notes 

German female swimmers
People from Flensburg
1939 births
Living people
Masters swimmers
Sportspeople from Schleswig-Holstein